Magashly-Almantayevo (Mağaşlı-Almantay) is a rural locality (a village) in Nizhnesikiyazovsky Selsoviet, Baltachevsky District, Bashkortostan, Russia. The population was 248 as of 2010. There are 4 streets.

Geography 
Magashly-Almantayevo is located 19 km north of Starobaltachevo (the district's administrative centre) by road. Urta-Yelga is the nearest rural locality.

References 

Rural localities in Baltachevsky District